Bill Bourke may refer to:
 Bill Bourke (politician), Australian politician
 Bill Bourke (footballer, born 1882), Australian rules footballer
 Bill Bourke (footballer, born 1927), Australian rules footballer